Stephen Hackett (26 December 1891 – 10 January 1969) was an Irish hurler who played as a centre-back for the Tipperary senior team.

Hackett made his first appearance for the team during the 1913 championship and was a regular member of the starting fifteen at various times until his retirement after the 1932 championship. During that time, he won one All-Ireland medal and three Munster medals.

At club level, Hackett was a multiple county championship medalist with Toomevara.

His brother, Martin Hackett, was an All-Ireland winner with Dublin.

References

1891 births
1969 deaths
Toomevara hurlers
Tipperary inter-county hurlers
All-Ireland Senior Hurling Championship winners